The Chetan P. U. Science College is a Pre-University science college situated in Hubli. It was established in the year 2004 and is run by the Dyavappanavar - Valasang Education Academy.

Courses
Part 1
 English
 Kannada or Hindi or Sanskrit

Part 2
 Physics
 Chemistry
 Mathematics
 Biology or Statistics

References

Education in Dharwad district
Universities and colleges in Hubli-Dharwad